Alexander Bernhuber (born 18 May 1992) is an Austrian farmer politician of the Austrian People's Party (ÖVP) who was elected as a Member of the European Parliament in 2019 with over 30,000 preferential votes.

Early life and education
Bernhuber attended the Federal Institute of Education and Research Francisco Josephinum which trains farmers, agricultural and food technologists and agricultural computer scientists. The focus is set on research, test and evaluate in the fields of agricultural engineering, digital farming, energetic use of biomass and in food and biotechnology. After his graduation he studied at the University of Natural Resources and Life Sciences (BOKU) in Vienna.

Career
Since 2016, Bernhuber has been an Austrian delegate to the European Council of Young Farmers (CEJA). From November 2017 till November 2018 he was the Deputy Federal Director of the Austrian Rural Youth Organisation.
Bernhuber runs a farm with crops and beef cattle in Lower Austria  In addition to his work as a farmer, he worked as an agricultural policy consultant in the Lower Austrian Farmers' Union.

Since becoming a Member of the European Parliament, Bernhuber has been serving on the Committee on the Environment, Public Health and Food Safety; the Committee on Petitions and the Committee on Culture and Education. In addition to his committee assignments, he is part of the European Parliament Intergroup on Small and Medium-Sized Enterprises (SMEs).

He is very active in the environmental field and has published a booklet called the Austrian Green Deal which focuses on the implementation of the European Green Deal in Austria. As representative of farmers his main objective is to stand up for protecting rural livelihoods; strengthening regional and high quality food and food supply; making rural areas more attractive.  
As youngest member of the European Peoples Party in the European Parliament.

References

Living people
1992 births
MEPs for Austria 2019–2024
Social Democratic Party of Austria MEPs
Social Democratic Party of Austria politicians